Pope Gelasius can refer to:

Pope Gelasius I, in office 492–496
Pope Gelasius II, in office 1118–1119

Gelasius